Lester State Ultralight Flightpark  was a state-owned, public-use ultralight airport located two nautical miles (3.7 km) east of the central business district of Lester, a town in King County, Washington, United States. It is owned by the WSDOT Aviation Division.

Facilities 
It has one runway designated 5/23 with a turf surface measuring 400 by 100 feet (122 x 30 m). It also has one helipad designated H1 with a turf surface measuring 100 by 100 feet (30 x 30 m).

References

External links 
 

Airports in King County, Washington
Ultralight aviation